Richard W. McClain (born December 31, 1941) is a former Republican member of the Indiana House of Representatives, representing the 24th District from 1994 to 2012. He was a Logansport City Engineer from 1980 to 1983 and a Jefferson Township Trustee from 1978 to 1982.

References

External links
Representative Richard McClain official Indiana State Legislature site
 

1941 births
Living people
People from Logansport, Indiana
Republican Party members of the Indiana House of Representatives